Marcel Duriez (20 June 1940 – 2 February 2023) was a French hurdler. He competed in the 110 metres hurdles at the 1960, 1964 and the 1968 Summer Olympics.

Duriez died in Clermont-Ferrand on 2 February 2023, at the age of 82.

References

External links
 

1940 births
2023 deaths
French male hurdlers
Olympic male hurdlers
Olympic athletes of France
Athletes (track and field) at the 1960 Summer Olympics
Athletes (track and field) at the 1964 Summer Olympics
Athletes (track and field) at the 1968 Summer Olympics
Mediterranean Games silver medalists for France
Mediterranean Games medalists in athletics
Athletes (track and field) at the 1959 Mediterranean Games
Japan Championships in Athletics winners
20th-century French people
Sportspeople from Nord (French department)
People from Seclin